ScoreBig is a startup company headquartered in South Windsor, Connecticut, United States, that focuses on the liquidation and sale of “undersold” ticket inventory for sports, concerts, theater, and other live entertainment events.

Ticket service
ScoreBig allows event goers to purchase last minute tickets to sold-out events in addition to the latest on sales occurring for popular artists, teams, and productions. ScoreBig safeguards their transactions with a 200% Money-Back Guarantee, under a secure checkout, with interactive seat maps to guide ticket purchases.

History

ScoreBig was founded by Adam Kanner and Joel Milne in 2009. Kanner served as the Vice President of Relationship Marketing & Business Development for the NBA. Milne previous lead Ivize as CEO, a litigation services company, and founded season ticketing software named Season Ticket Solutions. Kanner and Milne were joined by David Goldberg, (Chief Executive Officer, formerly Executive Vice President at Ticketmaster and CEO at Youbet.com) Neil Kaplan (Chief Revenue Officer, formerly at Internet Brands and Vantage Media), Alison Burnham (Vice President of Pricing and Analytics), Peter Sinclair (VP of Marketing—formerly GM of Online Channel at Green Dot and Engagement Manager at McKinsey & Company),  and David Marcus (SVP of Partnerships—formerly at TicketMaster and Warner Music).

ScoreBig launched to members-only on December 15, 2010, with more than 600,000 tickets available.

On February 3, 2011, ScoreBig announced a partnership with TicketBiscuit, adding tickets from comedy clubs, music vendors and event organizers to ScoreBig's inventory.

In April 2011, ScoreBig raised $14 million in series B funding led by U.S. Venture Partners.

In September 2013, ScoreBig raised $10 million in new funding from Checketts Partners Investment Fund (CPIF) and announced the hiring of a key industry veteran, long time board advisor and former Ticketmaster EVP David Goldberg.

In October 2014, ScoreBig announced that it has raised $18M in new funding led by Hearst Ventures with participation from both new and existing investors.

In January 2015,  ScoreBig announced a multiyear partnership with Ticketmaster, in which it will become directly integrated with the industry giant's primary ticketing system. In the deal, ScoreBig will appear as a purchase option for events involving teams and event promoters that are clients of the two companies and that opt in. The partnership includes several cross-promotional, marketing and online traffic-sharing components, and the shared clients will receive additional data on customer ticket searching and purchase patterns.

On November 12, 2016, ScoreBig.com came under new management of a subsidiary of TicketNetwork Inc. The subsidiary acquired and licensed select assets of the company formerly known as ScoreBig Inc, which went out of business in September 2016. The subsidiary is operating www.scorebig.com on a going-forward basis.

References

External links
 

Ticket sales companies
Companies based in Los Angeles
Online retailers of the United States
Internet properties established in 2009